Richard R. Vuylsteke is the current President of East–West Center.

From 2008 to 2016, he was the president of the American Chamber of Commerce in Hong Kong. He was formerly the Executive Director of the American Chamber of Commerce in Taipei and served on the Board of Directors of Taipei American School, a school for which he authored the history. The book, Ties that Bind, was published in 1999. A paperback edition became available in 2006.

In February 2008, Vuylsteke was appointed president of the American Chamber of Commerce in Hong Kong. He took office as East–West Center's 11th chief executive on July 1, 2017.

He has a wife, Josephine Wu Vuylsteke, and three sons: William, Jonathan, and Michael Vuylsteke. He is a graduate of Illinois College and earned his M.A. and PhD from University of Hawaiʻi at Mānoa.

References

External links
American Chamber of Commerce in Taipei official site

Living people
Year of birth missing (living people)
Illinois College alumni
University of Hawaiʻi at Mānoa alumni